Tyrolean Airways, officially Tyrolean Airways Tiroler Luftfahrt GmbH, was an Austrian regional airline based in Innsbruck with its hub at Vienna International Airport and its homebase at Innsbruck Airport. It was owned by the Lufthansa Group and was an affiliate of the Star Alliance together with its parent Austrian Airlines.

Tyrolean operated regional flights under the Austrian Arrows brand on behalf of Austrian Airlines from 2003 until July 2012, when nearly all employees and the fleet of Austrian Airlines was transferred to it following a labour dispute. Following a new labour agreement, Tyrolean was merged into Austrian Airlines and dissolved as a company on 31 March 2015.

History

Early years
The airline was established in 1958 as Aircraft Innsbruck by Gernot Langes-Swarovski and Christian Schwemberger-Swarovski. It adopted the title Tyrolean Airways when scheduled services began on 1 April 1980.

Tyrolean Airways was the only airline to operate Dash 7 airplanes into the dangerous Courchevel Airport in France.

Development as part of Austrian Airlines
The airline was acquired by Austrian Airlines in March 1998 after the original owner, Mr Gernot Langes-Swarovski, made the company available for purchase. In 2003, as part of an effort by its parent company to consolidate its brand, the fleet was rebranded as Austrian Arrows with livery changed to match that of the Austrian Airlines Group. Airline operations, however, were still managed independently by Tyrolean from its Innsbruck base.

Since 1 July 2012, all flights of the Austrian Airlines Group were carried out by Tyrolean Airways. In a consolidated effort to save Austrian Airlines from bankruptcy, the Austrian Airlines CEO at the time, Mr Jaan Albrecht fused the entire fleet and staff of the Austrian Airlines Group, approximately 460 pilots and 1,500 cabin crew, into Tyrolean to maintain operations. All Austrian Airlines Group flights — except for a single Boeing 777-200ER (OE-LPB) due to international traffic laws — were operated by Tyrolean, but maintained their Austrian flight numbers.

In October 2014, it was reported that Tyrolean's flight operations and staff were to be re-integrated into Austrian Airlines by 31 March 2015 as a new labour agreement had been signed. Accordingly, on this date all flight operations, crew members and aircraft were transferred back into Austrian Airlines while Tyrolean Airways was dissolved after serving as a vessel to float Austrian Airlines back into operations.

Fleet

The Tyrolean Airways fleet included:

References

External links

Official website of Tyrolean Airways
Official website of Austrian Airlines

Defunct airlines of Austria
Airlines established in 1978
Airlines disestablished in 2015
Austrian companies established in 1978
2015 disestablishments in Austria
Former Star Alliance affiliate members